Bid Qatar-e Bon Rud (also Romanized as Bīd Qaţār-e Bon Rūd; also known as Bīdqaţār) is a village in Dasht-e Arzhan Rural District, Arzhan District, Shiraz County, Fars Province, Iran. At the 2006 census, its population was 103, in 20 families.

References 

Populated places in Shiraz County